Jessica Rose Shufelt (born May 29, 1990) is an American soccer forward who played for Portland Thorns FC.

Youth career
Shufelt was a forward at the University of Connecticut. She scored 11 times for the Huskies adding 10 assists. During the summers of 2011 and 2012 Shufelt also played for the Ottawa Fury Women in the W-League.

Professional career
On February 7, 2013, she was taken in the 5th round of the 2013 NWSL Supplemental Draft by the Portland Thorns.

References

Portland Thorns FC players
1990 births
Living people
UConn Huskies women's soccer players
Soccer players from New York (state)
American women's soccer players
USL W-League (1995–2015) players
Women's association football forwards
National Women's Soccer League players
Damallsvenskan players
Mallbackens IF players
Division 1 Féminine players
Ottawa Fury (women) players
Expatriate women's soccer players in Canada
American expatriate sportspeople in Canada
American expatriate sportspeople in France
American expatriate sportspeople in Sweden
Expatriate women's footballers in France
Expatriate women's footballers in Sweden